Penllech is a village and former civil parish in the Welsh county of Gwynedd.  The parish was abolished in 1934, and incorporated into Tudweiliog.

See also
St Mary's Church, Penllech

References

Villages in Gwynedd
Tudweiliog